Tim Anderson is an American-British cook and writer who was named the winner of 2011's MasterChef competition broadcast on BBC One.

Life and career
Anderson was born in Madison, Wisconsin and raised in Racine, Wisconsin. He moved to Los Angeles in 2002, where he studied Japanese food history at Occidental College. After graduating in 2006, he moved to Kitakyushu, Japan, to further his interest in Japanese cuisine. He moved to London with his British wife in 2008 and started his career as a craft beer bar manager. He opened his first restaurant, Nanban Brixton in 2015. His second restaurant, Nanban Central, opened in 2019. He left both businesses in 2021. He has published five books on Japanese cuisine and is a regular contributor to BBC Radio 4’s culinary panel show, The Kitchen Cabinet.

Publications
 Nanban: Japanese Soul Food (2015)
 Japaneasy: Classic and Modern Japanese Recipes to Cook at Home (2017)
Tokyo Stories: A Japanese Cookbook (2019)
Vegan Japaneasy: Classic and Modern Vegan Japanese Recipes to Cook at Home (2020)
Your Home Izakaya: Fun and Simple Recipes Inspired by the Drinking-and-Dining Dens of Japan (2021)

References

Living people
American chefs
American male chefs
English television chefs
Reality cooking competition winners
Writers from Racine, Wisconsin
Year of birth missing (living people)